Parornix innotata is a moth of the family Gracillariidae. It is known from Georgia, Maine and Maryland in the United States.

References

Parornix
Moths of North America
Moths described in 1907